Absouya is a department or commune of Oubritenga Province in western Burkina Faso. Its capital lies at the town of Oubritenga. According to the 1996 census the department has a total population of 26,188.

Towns and villages
 Absouya	(2 017 inhabitants) (capital)
 Bargo	(2 021 inhabitants)
 Batenga	(650 inhabitants)
 Bendogo	(2 341 inhabitants)
 Bilogtenga	(3 216 inhabitants)
 Danaogo	(1 228 inhabitants)
 Gounghin	(1 768 inhabitants)
 Largo	(1 021 inhabitants)
 Moanéga	(1 789 inhabitants)
 Mockin	(2 580 inhabitants)
 Nabdoghin	(1 281 inhabitants)
 Nioniogo	(1 860 inhabitants)
 Sattin	(968 inhabitants)
 Siguinvoussé	(1 036 inhabitants)
 Siny	(526 inhabitants)
 Tambizinsé	(390 inhabitants)
 Tampaongo	(1 496 inhabitants)

References

Departments of Burkina Faso
Oubritenga Province